Deadhorse Lake is located near Clarkdale in North Central Arizona.

Fish species
 Rainbow trout
 Largemouth Bass
 Sunfish
 Catfish (Channel)

References

External links
 Arizona Boating Locations Facilities Map
 Arizona Fishing Locations Map

Lakes of Yavapai County, Arizona
Lakes of Arizona